The Larmanaye Faunal Reserve has an area of 3040 km2 as it supports rare wildlife species  It had been proposed initially by the local people as a total reserve to cover an area 882 km2.

References

Faunal reserves
Protected areas of Chad